Evelyn Clair Thomas, (née Abplanalp; born December 2, 2003), known professionally as Evie Clair, is a musical artist and reality television personality who appeared on the twelfth season of the talent competition series America's Got Talent.

Early life
Clair is the daughter of Hillary and Amos Abplanalp and is the second oldest of five children, with one older brother and three younger sisters. Clair also has a step-brother, three step-sisters, and a half-sister from her mother's second marriage, all of whom are younger than her. She has been playing piano since she was two years old. On September 8, 2017, the day after Clair advanced to the America's Got Talent finals, she announced that her father had died from colon cancer. Clair and her family are members of The Church of Jesus Christ of Latter-day Saints. On December 17, 2021, Evie married Clancy Thomas.

Career 
Clair began acting as a tap dancer in Anne at Hale Center Theater in Gilbert, Arizona at the age of eight. She sang the national anthem at an Arizona Diamondbacks' game.

America's Got Talent
Clair auditioned for America's Got Talent three times before getting on the show, auditioning with "Arms" by Christina Perri and won praise from Perri. Due to her father's death Clair was offered the opportunity to come back the following season, however she chose to stay on course and perform in the upcoming finals.

Accommodations were made for Clair on the program. A woman who was overseeing wardrobe often bought two skirts for her, ensuring there was enough fabric to create outfits with long enough skirts, which is due to the modesty-focused dress standards which the Church of Jesus Christ of Latter-day Saints has and which Clair adopted for herself.

Album

On May 23, 2018, it was announced an album by Clair was plannned. The album was officially released on June 1, 2018. All of the songs are performed by Evie Clair except for the song Okay Day which features Kirra L.A, her sister.; Clair also sings on the track.

Track listing 

In 2018, she starred in 'The Unbelievables Christmas spectacular' in Reno as the headline act.

References

2003 births
Living people
American women pop singers
Latter Day Saints from Arizona
Singers from Arizona
21st-century American singers
America's Got Talent contestants
21st-century American women singers